Tetraonyx is a genus of blister beetles in the family Meloidae. There are about nine described species in Tetraonyx.

Species
These nine species belong to the genus Tetraonyx:
 Tetraonyx albipilosa Van Dyke, 1929 i c g
 Tetraonyx bipunctata Audinet-Serville, 1825 g
 Tetraonyx femoralis Dugès, 1869 i c g
 Tetraonyx fulva LeConte, 1853 i c g b
 Tetraonyx lemoulti Pic, 1915 g
 Tetraonyx ochraceoguttatus Duges, 1881 g
 Tetraonyx quadrimaculata (Fabricius, 1792) i c g b
 Tetraonyx rufus Duges, 1869 g
 Tetraonyx undulata Haag-Rutenberg, 1879 g
Data sources: i = ITIS, c = Catalogue of Life, g = GBIF, b = Bugguide.net

References

Further reading

 
 
 

Meloidae
Articles created by Qbugbot